Xavier Casmier Amaechi (born 5 January 2001) is an English professional footballer who plays as a winger for German  club Hamburger SV.

Early and personal life
Amaechi was born in Bath on 5 January 2001. He is of Nigerian descent.

Club career
After playing youth football for Arsenal, Amaechi signed for German club Hamburger SV in July 2019. He made his HSV debut on 11 August 2019 in the first round of the 2019–20 DFB-Pokal, coming on as a substitute in the 100th minute in extra time for David Kinsombi in the away match against Chemnitzer FC.

On 19 January 2021, Amaechi signed with 2. Bundesliga club Karlsruher SC on loan until the end of the season.

On 28 June 2021 he signed a six-month loan deal with Bolton Wanderers. Bolton were unable to afford his wages, and Hamburger SV refused to pay his wages during the loan spell – so Amaechi agreed to a pay cut during the loan as he specifically wanted to join Bolton over other options in England. On 20 July Amaechi fractured his metatarsal in a pre-season game against Preston North End, with the injury requiring surgery which would side-line him for a number of weeks. His debut finally came on 12 November when he came on as a late substitute in a 2–0 win against Crewe Alexandra. His first competitive start and goal came on 27 November when he scored Bolton's first goal in a 2–2 draw against Cheltenham Town. On 30 December, the loan was extended until the end of the season.

International career
He is an England youth international. In May 2018, Amaechi was included in the England under-17 squad as they hosted the 2018 UEFA European Under-17 Championship. He scored in the quarter-final against Norway but a yellow card in this match led to his suspension for the semi-final defeat against the Netherlands. He was subsequently included in the UEFA team of the tournament.

On 13 November 2019, Amaechi made his England U19 debut during the 4–0 2020 U19 EURO qualifying win over Luxembourg.

On 13 October 2020, Amaechi made his U20 debut and scored during a 2–0 victory over Wales at St. George's Park.

Career statistics

Honours
Individual
UEFA European Under-17 Championship Team of the Tournament: 2018

References

2001 births
Living people
Black British sportsmen
English people of Nigerian descent
English footballers
Association football wingers
England youth international footballers
English Football League players
Arsenal F.C. players
Hamburger SV players
Karlsruher SC players
Bolton Wanderers F.C. players
2. Bundesliga players
Regionalliga players
English expatriate footballers
English expatriate sportspeople in Germany
Expatriate footballers in Germany